The 2013–14 Illinois Fighting Illini men's basketball team represented the University of Illinois at Urbana–Champaign in the 2013–14 NCAA Division I men's basketball season. Led by second year head coach John Groce, the Illini played their home games at State Farm Center and were members of the Big Ten Conference. They finished the season 20–15, 7–11 in Big Ten play to finish in a tie for eighth place. They advanced to the quarterfinals of the Big Ten tournament where they lost to Michigan. They were invited to the National Invitation Tournament where they defeated Boston University in the first round before losing in the second round to Clemson.

Pre-season

Departures

2013 additions

Incoming freshmen

Incoming transfer students

 Jon Ekey was immediately eligible to play during the 13–14 season due to the graduate student transfer exception rules of the NCAA.

Roster

Schedule and results

|-
!colspan=12 style="background:#; color:#;"| Exhibition
|-

|-
!colspan=12 style="background:#; color:#;"|  Non-conference season
|-

|-
!colspan=12 style="background:#; color:#;"| Big Ten regular season
|-

|-
!colspan=12 style="background:#; color:#;"| Big Ten tournament

|-
!colspan=12 style="background:#; color:#;"| NIT

Rankings

See also
 2013–14 Illinois Fighting Illini women's basketball team

References

Illinois
Illinois Fighting Illini men's basketball seasons
Illinois
Illinois
Illinois